The WG66 is a submachine gun of East German origin. The weapon is chambered in the 7.62×25mm Tokarev round.

References
 Eigenbau, Maschinenpistolen WG 66 aus Wiesa, DWJ 2008/7, pp. 60-63

External links 
 image

7.62×25mm Tokarev submachine guns
Military of East Germany
Submachine guns of Germany